Ultramafic rocks (also referred to as ultrabasic rocks, although the terms are not wholly equivalent) are igneous and meta-igneous rocks with a very low silica content (less than 45%), generally >18% MgO, high FeO, low potassium, and are composed of usually greater than 90% mafic minerals (dark colored, high magnesium and iron content). The Earth's mantle is composed of ultramafic rocks.  Ultrabasic is a more inclusive term that includes igneous rocks with low silica content that may not be extremely enriched in Fe and Mg, such as carbonatites and ultrapotassic igneous rocks.

Intrusive ultramafic rocks

Intrusive ultramafic rocks are often found in large, layered ultramafic intrusions where differentiated rock types often occur in layers. Such cumulate rock types do not represent the chemistry of the magma from which they crystallized. The ultramafic intrusives include the dunites, peridotites and pyroxenites. Other rare varieties include troctolite which has a greater percentage of calcic plagioclase. These grade into the anorthosites. Gabbro and norite often occur in the upper portions of the layered ultramafic sequences. Hornblendite and, rarely phlogopite, are also found.

Volcanic ultramafic rocks on Earth
Volcanic ultramafic rocks are rare outside of the Archaean and are essentially restricted to the Neoproterozoic or earlier. Subvolcanic ultramafic rocks and dykes persist longer, but are also rare. There is evidence of ultramafic rocks elsewhere in the solar system.

Examples include komatiite and picritic basalt. Komatiites can be host to ore deposits of nickel.

Ultramafic tuff 
Ultramafic tuff is extremely rare. It has a characteristic abundance of olivine or serpentine and a scarcity or absence of feldspar and quartz. Rare occurrences may include unusual surface deposits of maars of kimberlites in the diamond fields of southern Africa and other regions.

Ultrapotassic ultramafic rocks
Technically ultrapotassic rocks and melilitic rocks are considered a separate group, based on melting model criteria, but there are ultrapotassic and highly silica-under-saturated rocks with >18% MgO which can be considered "ultramafic".

Ultrapotassic, ultramafic igneous rocks such as lamprophyre, lamproite and kimberlite are known to have reached the surface of the Earth. Although no modern eruptions have been observed, analogues are preserved.

Most of these rocks occur as dikes, diatremes, lopoliths or laccoliths, and very rarely, intrusions. Most kimberlite and lamproite occurrences occur as volcanic and subvolcanic diatremes and maars; lavas are virtually unknown.

Vents of Proterozoic lamproite (Argyle diamond mine), and Cenozoic lamproite (Gaussberg, Antarctica) are known, as are vents of Devonian lamprophyre (Scotland). Kimberlite pipes in Canada, Russia and South Africa have incompletely preserved tephra and agglomerate facies.

These are generally diatreme events and as such are not lava flows although tephra and ash deposits are partially preserved. These represent low-volume volatile melts and attain their ultramafic chemistry via a different process than typical ultramafic rocks.

Metamorphic ultramafic rocks
Metamorphism of ultramafic rocks in the presence of water and/or carbon dioxide results in two main classes of metamorphic ultramafic rock; talc carbonate and serpentinite.

Talc carbonation reactions occur in ultramafic rocks at lower greenschist through to granulite facies metamorphism when the rock in question is subjected to metamorphism and the metamorphic fluid has more than 10% molar proportion of CO2 (carbon dioxide).

When such metamorphic fluids have less than 10% molar proportion of CO2, reactions favor serpentinisation, resulting in chlorite-serpentine-amphibole type assemblages.

Distribution in space and time
The majority of ultramafic rocks are exposed in orogenic belts, and predominate in Archaean and Proterozoic terranes. Ultramafic magmas in the Phanerozoic are rarer, and there are very few recognised true ultramafic lavas in the Phanerozoic.

Many surface exposures of ultramafic rocks occur in ophiolite complexes where deep mantle-derived rocks have been obducted onto continental crust along and above subduction zones.

Soil and regolith on ultramafic rock

Serpentine soil is a magnesium rich, calcium, potassium and phosphorus poor soil that develops on the regolith derived from ultramafic rocks. Ultramafic rocks also contain elevated amounts of chromium and nickel which may be toxic to plants. As a result, a distinctive type of vegetation develops on these soils. Examples are the ultramafic woodlands and barrens of the Appalachian mountains and piedmont, the "wet maquis" of the New Caledonia rain forests, and the ultramafic forests of Mount Kinabalu and other peaks in Sabah, Malaysia.  Vegetation is typically stunted, and sometimes includes endemic species adapted to the soils.

Often thick, magnesite-calcrete caprock, laterite and duricrust forms over ultramafic rocks in tropical and subtropical environments. Particular floral assemblages associated with highly nickeliferous ultramafic rocks are indicative tools for mineral exploration.

Weathered ultramafic rocks may form lateritic nickel ore deposits.

Other celestial bodies

Io 
The magma immediately below these hot spots is probably about  hotter, based on surface-to-subsurface temperature differences observed for lava on Earth.

Mercury 
Mercury appears to have ultramafic volcanic rock.

See also 
 Chromitite 
 Magnetite
 Kambalda type komatiitic nickel ore deposits
 Fractional crystallization (geology)
 Volcanism on Io, a moon of Jupiter

References

 
Metamorphic rocks